Carl Wilhelm von  Heideck (born in Sarralbe, Moselle, on 6 December 1788 – died in Munich on 21 February 1861) was a Bavarian military officer, a philhellene and painter.

Biography 
Von Heideck studied art in Zürich. In 1801, he entered the military academy in Munich. Since 1805 he was in the Bavarian army, taking part in campaigns in Austria, Prussia and Tyrol, and then in Spain after 1810.

In 1814, with the rank of major, he accompanied the crown prince and future Ludwig I of Bavaria to the Congress of Vienna.

In 1826, he went to help the Greeks fight for their independence against the Ottoman Empire, during the Greek War of Independence. 
In 1827, he took part under the orders of Thomas Gordon to the attempt to help the Acropolis of Athens. In 1828, Ioannis Kapodistrias named him commander of Nafplion and a few months later military governor of Argos.

In 1830, he went back to Munich and got back his rank of colonel of the Bavarian army. He started again to paint.

In 1832, when Otto the second son of Ludwig I of Bavaria was designated to become king of Greece, Heideck was nominated to the regency council. It is traced, that he lived at Kasern Straße 12 (today Leonrodstraße) in Munich around 1850.  The Heideckstraße in the quarter Neuhausen of Munich is named after him.

Notes and references 

1788 births
1861 deaths
19th-century regents of Greece
People from Moselle (department)
Military personnel of Bavaria
Bavarian generals
19th-century German painters
19th-century male artists
German male painters
German philhellenes in the Greek War of Independence
Naturalized citizens of Greece
Hellenic Army officers
German military personnel of the Napoleonic Wars